Collar is a 2014 Canadian horror film directed by Ryan Nicholson.  The film follows two young men who, while filming amateur fight videos and other lurid activities on the streets, stumble across a deranged criminal known only as "Massive", who rapes and kills his way through the city as the sociopathic amateur filmmakers film him and a female rookie cop attempts to stop him.

Before the movie release in 2014 its director Ryan Nicholson said in conversation with Tony Vilgotsky from DarkCity magazine that Collar can be compared to one of his previous movies, Gutterballs in a level of sexual violence, but will be more spectacular in part of depiction of the cruelty.

References

External links
 
 

2014 films
Canadian splatter films
2014 horror films
Canadian independent films
English-language Canadian films
2010s exploitation films
Films shot in Vancouver
Films directed by Ryan Nicholson
Indiegogo projects
Crowdfunded films
2010s English-language films
2010s Canadian films